Muqmad or oodkac is a Somali dish consisting of preserved meat. The term muqmad is used in the northern Somali territories such as Djibouti and throughout Somaliland; the term odkac is more popular in the south (Somalia).

It is typically eaten with canjeero, but sometimes by itself. Although it is more usual for it to be eaten for breakfast and lunch, it is also sometimes eaten for dinner.

Muqmad or odkac is made by letting the meat cook and soak in melted butter, and then cutting it into cubes.

References

Somali cuisine